Icknield Community College is a  coeducational secondary school located in Watlington, Oxfordshire, England. It offers tuition for years 7-11 (ages 11–16), culminating in the GCSE exams, and has humanities specialist status. The school is situated next to Watlington Primary School.

Icknield admits students from its catchment area covering, in addition to Watlington itself, the nearby Oxfordshire villages of Chinnor, Chalgrove, Benson and others, as well from Stokenchurch across the county border in Buckinghamshire.

In its March 2015 Ofsted inspection, the school was rated "Good".

In 2017, Icknield converted to academy status, and joined the Acer Trust, a multi-academy trust of Oxfordshire schools.

Subjects 
English Language, English Literature, Mathematics, Physics, Chemistry, Biology, ICT, Applied ICT, Religious Education, Physical Education, Food Technology, Geography, French, Spanish, Drama, Music, Art, Textiles, History, Media Studies.

Note that English, Science and Maths have classes of students who have a similar understanding of the subject.

Day timings
The timing of the school day is shown below.

Monday, Tuesday, Wednesday, Thursday, Friday

Mentoring: 8.30 - 8.45

Period 1: 8.50 - 9.50

Period 2: 9.50 - 10.50

Break: 10.50 - 11.10

Period 3: 11.10 - 12.10

Period 4: 12.10 - 1.20 *

Lunch: 1.00 - 2.00 *

Lesson 5: 2.00 - 3.00

Buses: 3.00

* Year 7 P4 ends at 1.00

Year 8 P4 ends at 1.05

Year 9 P4 ends at 1.15

Year 10 and 11 P4 ends at 1.20

I.L. denotes Independent Learning and consists of tasks set for pupils to complete on their own by subject teachers.

Notable former pupils
Karl Penhale (born 1992), cricketer

References

External links 
 Icknield Community College official site
  on Ofsted website

Secondary schools in Oxfordshire
Academies in Oxfordshire
Watlington, Oxfordshire